Royal Air Force Chipping Norton or more simply RAF Chipping Norton is a former  Royal Air Force satellite station located near Chipping Norton, Oxfordshire, England. It was operational from 10 July 1940 to 1945 and returned to agricultural use when disposed of in 1953.

History

The following units were posted to this airfield at some point:
 No. 3 Maintenance Unit RAF.
 No. 6 (Pilots) Advanced Flying Unit RAF renamed No. 6 Service Flying Training School RAF.
 No. 11 Service Flying Training School RAF.  
 No. 15 Service Flying Training School RAF.
 No. 1517 (Beam Approach Training) Flight RAF.
 
Airspeed Oxfords and North American Harvard I's flew from this airfield.

The station was bombed on two occasions in October and November 1940. Little damage was done and on the second attempt the Luftwaffe missed the airfield by about a mile to the East.

Current use

The site is currently farmland, partly owned by Jeremy Clarkson and used for his show, Clarkson's Farm. Part of the site is used for airsoft.

See also
 List of former Royal Air Force stations

References

Royal Air Force stations in Oxfordshire
Royal Air Force stations of World War II in the United Kingdom